Larry Louis Poncino  (born February 3, 1957) is a former umpire in Major League Baseball. His Major League umpiring debut came on July 11, 1985, and his last game was on September 30, 2007. He umpired in the 2006 American League Division Series; the National League Championship Series in 1998, 2003, and 2005, and the 1996 MLB All-Star Game.  Poncino wore uniform number 13 during his National League stint, then changed to 39 when the NL and AL umpiring staffs merged in 2000.

Umpiring career 
Poncino was the plate umpire for Dennis Martínez's perfect game on July 28, 1991. On June 28, 2007, Poncino was the home plate umpire when Craig Biggio got his 3,000th hit against the Colorado Rockies. Poncino served in the National League from 1985 to 1988 and from 1991 to 1999. He worked in both leagues from 2002 to 2007.

Poncino retired due to a neck injury.

Personal 
Poncino's wife is named Jo Ann.  He attended the University of Nevada-Reno from 1975 to 1976.

See also 

 List of Major League Baseball umpires

References

External links 
MLB.com Bio
Retrosheet

1957 births
Living people
University of Nevada, Reno alumni
Major League Baseball umpires
Sportspeople from Los Angeles